The 2016 Liberian First Division League (known as the LFA-Cellcom First Division League for sponsorship reasons) is the 43rd season of the Liberian Premier League, the Liberian professional league for association football clubs, since the league's establishment in 1956.

The season was expected to start on Thursday 10 December 2015 but was postponed because some clubs had not completed the CAF Club Licensing criteria. The season finally commenced on 23 January 2016.

Teams 
A total of 10 teams are contesting the league, including seven sides from the 2015 season and three promoted from the 2015 Second Division League. On 20 & 27 September 2015, Mighty Dragons FC and ELWA United FC both earned promotion from the 2015 Second Division League after playing each other in a two-legged Second Division Championship Playoff with Mighty Dragons being crowned Second Division Champions after a 3-2 aggregate win. Holder FC also claimed a promotion place, after defeating Mighty Blue Angels in the Promotion Playoff.

The three teams replaced Jubilee FC, Aries FC, and MC Breweries who were relegated to the Second Division.

Two other First Division Clubs: I.E. and NPA Anchor were denied participation for the 2015-16 season due to their failure to meet the statutory requirements in the Club Licensing System.

Stadia and locations

Personnel

Note: Flags indicate national team as has been defined under FIFA eligibility rules. Players may hold more than one non-FIFA nationality.

League table

Winner of the 2015–16 Liberian FA Cup will qualify for the 2017 CAF Confederation Cup.

Season statistics

Scoring

Top scorers

Clean sheets

Discipline

Player

Most yellow cards: 1
Patrick Jackson (LPRC Oilers)
Sholee Quiah (Nimba United)
Wilton Ninneh (Nimba United)
Saylee Swen (LPRC Oilers)
Trokon Zeon (LPRC Oilers)

Most red cards: 1
Trokon Saykiameh (ELWA United)

Club

Most yellow cards: 3
LPRC Oilers

Most red cards: 1
ELWA United

Awards

Monthly awards

References

External links
Official Website

Football competitions in Liberia
2016 in African association football leagues
Lea